Marakkar/Maricar/Marecar/Marikkar/Markiyar/Marican/Marecan (Malayalam:Marakkar; Tamil: Marrakayar)(Sinhalese: Marakkala), is a South Asian Muslim community found in parts of the Indian states of Kerala (The Malabar Coast), Tamil Nadu (the Palk Strait and Coromandel Coast), and in Sri Lanka. The Marakkars speak Malayalam in Kerala and Tamil in Tamil Nadu and Sri Lanka. 

The community trace their ancestry to marriages between early Arab Muslim traders of the high seas and indigenous Paravar coastal women on the Gulf of Mannar coast and with Mukkuvar coastal women on the Travancore coast. Arab traders have also married with other South Asian women in India and Sri Lanka, but their descendants are not necessarily members of the Marakkar community.

Origins 
The Islamized Arabs who arrived on the Coromandel coast and Malabar Coast brought Islamic values and customs with them and inter-married with the indigenous women who followed the local Buddhist, Jain & Hindu customs. Naturally, their children will have imbibed both the Islamic and the local values and transmitted both to their descendants. From the outset, the Arabs must, in all probability, have asserted the centrality of the Islamic values in their relationship with the local women, at the same time making the necessary adjustments to local customs. This is the pattern that appears to have survived to this day.
Arab traders had a flourishing business in South India with the Pandian Kingdom (capital at Madurai), the rulers of Malabar (Kerala) and Ceylon (Sri Lanka).

With the advent of Islam, these Arab traders introduced the new faith in the region. They married amongst the local population and their descendants are the present day population of many settlements along the Tamil Nadu coast; many settlements on the Malabar / Kerala coast, and the southern sea coast of Ceylon like Galle and Batticola.

The main item of trade of the Arabs was natural pearls fished in the Gulf of Mannar, Palk Strait separating Ceylon (Sri Lanka) from South India and horses. These pearls were exchanged with horses brought from Arabia.

Deeper into roots 
The Marakkar traders originated from Cochin and their roots, according to SV Muhammed, in his book Charithrathile Marakkar Sannidhyam, the Marakkar family (Kunhali) originated from the Konkan and they were rice merchants. According to him, Marakkar was the family name and Kunhali was the titular name given by the Zamorin.

Though Marakkars have Arab roots they are differentiated from the Moplah of Malabar as the Moplas, in general, had forefathers from Arabia and mothers of local descent. They comprise both the Sunni and the Shiah groups and include converts. The Arabs are believed to come from many regions notably from the Red Sea coastal areas and the Hadhramaut region of present-day Yemen. Many present day Mappilla Muslims are Shafi; however, it could have been so that they claimed a direct lineage to an Arab trading group without converts. Some scholars opine that the migration to Tuticorin came about only in the 15th or 16th century after Portuguese persecution, though trade documentation indicates that many existed in those ports even earlier. Many of the present-day Tirunelveli Muslims claim to be descended from the Kerala Mappilas and follow Malabari religious teachers and social culture.

To summarize, the Marakkars are Moplas, though probably differing in exact origin and sub sect. They were always conductors of trade and migrated also to Tuticorin, Ceylon, Indonesia, Philippines and Malaysia.

So-called matrilineal "Kudi maraikkars" occur in some South Indian and Ceylon settlements. Here the term maraikkar is for the head of the Muslim populace dealing with fishing. They are covered in detail in the book Crucible of Conflict by Dennis B. McGilvray. They are also Moplah migrants from Malabar. In addition to Kudi Marakkars, there are plenty of regular Marakkar trading families as well in Ceylon.

Religion 
The Marakkars, the early Muslim inhabitants of Kerala, Coastal Tamil Nadu and Sri Lanka, are Sunnis of the Shafi‘i school of thought (Madhab).

Economic Status 
Most Marakkars, are in some way or other, connected to foreign trade through which they became more advanced economically and socially than the other Muslim groups in the locality and even many Hindu sub-castes.

The Marakkars were a known to be a powerful maritime spice trading community in the medieval South Asia. They traded in and with locations such as Myanmar, Thailand, Malaysia in East Asia and South Asia, Maldives and Sri Lanka. The Marakayar's have dominated the educational and economic landscape in Tamil Nadu since the 17th century.

Etymology 
There are two main hypothesis regarding the etymology of the term "Marrakayar", and its various forms.

The first being from the term 'Marakala+aayar' which may mean those who controlled or owned boats. In Tamil/Malayalam, "marakalam" signifies "wooden boat" and "aayar". that it is the association of these two words that gives Marakkayar.

KVK Iyer says in his history of Kerala that Marakkar was a prized title given by the Zamorin of Calicut. Derived from Marakka Rayar it signifies the captain of a ship Rayar (captain) of Marakkalam (ship).

Role in regional history 

According to tradition, the Kunjali Marakkars were maritime merchants of Arab descent who supported the trade in the Indian ocean who settled in the coastal regions of Kayalpattinam, Kilakarai, Thoothukudi, Nagore and Karaikal. But they shifted their trade to Kochi and then migrated to Ponnani in the Zamorin's dominion when the Portuguese fleets came to Kingdom of Cochin. With the emergence of the Portuguese in India, some Marakkars were forced to take up arms and enlist themselves in service of the Hindu king (the zamorin) of Calicut. The Marakkar naval chiefs of the Calicut were known as Kunjali Marakkars. The seamen were famous for their naval guerrilla warfare and hand-to-hand fighting on board. The Marakkar vessels — small, lightly armed and highly mobile — were a major threat to the Portuguese shipping all along the Indian west coast.

In 1598, the Portuguese convinced the Zamorin that Marakkar IV intended to take over his Kingdom to create a Muslim empire. In an act of betrayal, the Zamorin joined hands with the Portuguese who brutally killed him. Malabari Marakkars are credited with organizing the first naval defence of the Indian coast.

Language 
The Arabic language brought by the early merchants is no longer spoken, though many Arabic words and phrases are still commonly used. Until the recent past, the Mappila Muslims employed Arabi Malayalam and the Tamil Muslims employed Arwi as their native language, though this is also extinct as a spoken language. They today use Malayalam and Tamil respectively as their primary language with influence from Arabic. Many Arabic and Arabized words exist in the form of Malayalam and Tamil spoken by Marakkars. Among many examples, greetings and blessings are exchanged in Arabic instead of Malayalam/Tamil, such as Assalamu Alaikum instead of Shaanthiyum Samadanavum, Jazakallah instead of Nanni/Nandri and Pinjhan/Finjan/Pinjaanam for Bowl/Cup.

There are also words which are unique to Marakkars and Sri Lankan Moors such as Laatha for elder-sister, Kaka for elder-brother, Umma for mother and Vappa for father, suggesting a close relationship between Marakkars of India and Marrakkar and Moors of Sri Lanka. Note that the Marakkars of Sri Lanka fall under the group of 'Sri Lankan Moors' who are defined by the Sri Lankan government as a separate ethnic group. There are also words derived from Sinhala such as Mattapa for terrace. There are also words from Purananuru era such as Aanam for Kulambu and Puliaanam for rasam or soup.

Marakkars and Marakkayars 

Dr. J.B.P.More points out to spoken words, marriage customs, etc. which strongly connect the Marakkayars of Tamil to the Malabar Marakkars. It is also pointed out in his book that Malabar Marakkars had relations with the communities in the Kayalpatanam (Tuticorin) region, a group which conducted trade with Burma, Malacca and Indonesia.

To determine the origins of the Marakkars, JB More used another yardstick, their family system. Both the Tamil Marakkayars and Malabar Marakkars practice marumakkathayam (matrilinear system of inheritance) and settle in the bride's house. More thus believes that the Tamil Marakkayars came from Malabar.

It was only towards the 17th century that the Tamil Labbais came to the fore, as boatmen and fishermen. In another wave of migration, many Muslims left the Tamil country during the late 14th century in Marak Kalams (wooden boats) and landed on the coasts of Ceylon. Because they came in Marak Kalams the Sinhala people called them Marakkala Minissu.

Summarizing, the elite Chuliah (Kling to Malays) Muslims constituted the Maraikkayar caste in the early 14th century. This Tamil group were Sunni's and maintained ships and had strong relations with their Arab brethren as well as the holy cities of Arabia (the Labbias were the lower Sunni strata comprising fishermen, pearl divers etc.). The Kayalpatanam Marakkars controlled the Indian Ocean pearl trade. Rowthers conducted inland trade.

Susan Bayly states in her book Saints Goddesses and Kings that Tamil Marakkayars have always looked down upon converted Muslims and had a higher social standing, being directly linked to Arabs. She states the Sunni Shafi Madhab connection to Arabia as proof of their identity. They (marakkars) maintained the sect by intermarriage between the Marakkayars of Malabar and Tamil Nadu strictly. She states that Labbais sect are follow rules like marrying father's sister's daughter (Murapennu - a popular south Indian "kalyana murai"). Nagore, Kulasekarapattinam, Kayalpattanam, Kilakkarai, Adiramapattanam are the main centers with old mosques and remains of ancient Sahabi saint.

Bayly mentions Patattu marakkayar signifies a title or Pattam having been granted to one of these families. Could that be the Pattu marakkar that we know from Cochin? The Kayal Patanam Quadiri Sufis had connections with the Calicut Sufi families. This sort of confirms the connection between the Calicut, Cochin and Kayal Marakkayar families and the Arabic links. The Marakkayar port of Porto Novo (Mahmud Bandar) was a popular and busy port in the later years. In Ramnad however, the Marikkars mainly handled trade for the Setupati royal family.

The Rowther, Marakkayar, Lebbai and Kayalar are the four Muslim communities in Tamil Nadu. Rowthers follow the Hanafi madhab while Kayalar, Lebbai and Marakkayar belong to the Shafi branch of Islam which spread from the coasts of southern Yemen. Kayalar seems to be a subdivision of Marakkayar. Kayalars and Marakkayars are found primarily along the Coramandel coast. Rowthers predominate in the ASEAN.

Marakkars of Kottakal (Kerala) 
In Kerala Marakkar also known as Marikkars are mostly concentrated in and around Malabar. They were traditionally boatmen.

According to tradition, Marakkars were originally marine merchants of Kochi who left for Ponnani in the Samoothiri Raja's dominion when the Portuguese came to Kochi. They offered their men, ships and wealth in the defence of their motherland to the Samoothiri of Kozhikode-The Raja took them into his service and eventually they became the Admirals of his fleet. They served as the naval chiefs in the Zamorin's army. Kunjali Marakkar, one of the first Keralites to rebel against the Portuguese, hailed from the Marikkar community.

Present circumstances 
Traditionally, Maricars have been known for maritime trade throughout east Asia, but now, owing to better education, many of the community are professionals. The Kilakarai Maricars have played a big role in setting up educational institutes all over Tamil Nadu for the betterment of Tamil Muslims and Muslims in general. Many Maricars have connections with the Persian Gulf, Malaysia and Singapore. Some Maricars have moved to the UK, France (called Marecar) and the US.

It is a very close-knit community and they marry amongst themselves to maintain the lineage. Traditionally they follow the Shafi school of thought, as most of the Arabs who did trade with these regions followed that madhab.

The Maricars have a distinct Arab-Tamil composite culture and are traditionally very conservative. There was a time when the language had a strong Arabic flavour as most of their vocabulary was derived from pure Arab and classical Tamil.

Maraikayar Pattinam is a small place in the Ramanathapuram district. The people living there are called Maraikayars. Even before two generations they were operating Marakalam "wooden ships" to the entire world, especially to the Persian Gulf, Malaysia, Singapore, Sri Lanka and some European countries. The current generation has diversified into many areas apart from their seafaring traditions, but there are still some older people in Maraikayar Pattinam who traveled to many countries by the Marakalam.

See also
 A. P. J. Abdul Kalam
 Tamil Muslims
 Mappila Muslims
 Sri Lankan Moors

References

Further reading
 Medieval Seafarers of India – Lakshmi Subramaniam
 The Career and Legend of Vasco da Gama – Sanjay Subrahmanyam
 The Portuguese Empire in Asia, 1500–1700: A Political and Economic History – Sanjay Subrahmanyam
 Portuguese Cochin and the Maritime Trade of India – Pius Malekandathil
 India and the Indian Ocean World – Ashin Das Gupta
 Kerala Muslim History – P. A. Syed Mohammed
 Muslim Identity, Print Culture, and the Dravidian Factor in Tamil Nadu - J. B. Prashant More
 Saints Goddesses and Kings – Susan Bayly
 Political Evolution of Muslims in Tamil Nadu and Madras - J. B. Prashant More
 Charithrathile Marakkar Sannidhyam – S. V. Mohammed
 Kunjali Marakkar – Kerala Calling Malabar & the Portuguese – K. M. Panikkar

Muslim communities of India
Social groups of Tamil Nadu
Sri Lankan Moors
Social groups of Kerala
Muslim communities of Kerala